Jorge Llopis (1919–1976) was a Spanish satirist, actor and playwright best known for Los Pelópidas, a two-act satire of Greek tragedy, and for the parodic false anthology of the Spanish poetry Las mil peores poesías de la lengua castellana.

Filmography

1919 births
1976 deaths
Spanish male dramatists and playwrights
20th-century Spanish dramatists and playwrights
20th-century Spanish male writers